Satoruvashicoba  (サトルヴァシコバ, Satoru Kobayashi, born July 23,1974) is a  Lightweight Japanese kickboxer who is notable for fighting in the All Japan Kickboxing Federation and K-1. He also has victories over Satoshi Kobayashi and Koji Yoshimoto.

Career 

January 4, 2006 in Tokyo, Japan AJKF NEW YEAR KICK FESTIVAL 2006, Satoruvashicoba defeated Koji Yoshimoto to win the AJKF All Japan Lightweight Championship by KO in the second round.

Championships and awards  

Kickboxing
All Japan Kickboxing Federation
2006 AJKF Lightweight Champion
2004 AJKF All Japan Lightweight Tournament 2004 Runner-Up 

Muay Thai
 WFCA 
2005 WFCA Muaythai Super Lightweight Championship

Karate
 Amateur 
2001 All Japan Shin Karate Lightweight Championship Winner
2002 All Japan Shin Karate Super Lightweight Championship Winner

Kickboxing record

|- style="background:#fbb;"
| 2008-01-04|| Loss ||align=left| Yu Hirono || AJKF "New Year Kick Festival 2008" - 70's Tournament Reserve Fight ||  Japan || Decision (Unanimous) || 3 || 3:00
|- style="background:#fbb;"
| 2007-10-03 || Loss ||align=left| Murat Direkçi || K-1 World MAX 2007 Final, Reserve Fight || Tokyo, Japan || KO (Left Hook) || 2 || 0:39
|- style="background:#fbb;"
| 2007-04-04 || Loss ||align=left| Heung Pak-Wing || K-1 MAX 2007 Final Elimination || Yokohama, Japan || TKO (Right Knee to the Head) || 1 || 0:33
|- style="background:#fbb;"
| 2007-02-05|| Loss ||align=left| Kazuya Yasuhiro || K-1 WORLD MAX 2007 ~Japan National Team Tournament ~[Reserve Fight] ||  Japan || Decision (Unanimous) || 3 || 3:00
|- style="background:#cfc;"
| 2006-09-04|| Win ||align=left| Taka Osamitsu || K-1 WORLD MAX 2006 〜 World Championship || Japan || KO (Left cross) || 1 || 0:55
|- style="background:#fbb;"
| 2006-07-23|| Loss ||align=left| Hiromasa Masuda || AJKF "Spear of Destiny" ||  Tokyo, Japan || TKO (Doctor Stoppage) || 3 || 2:13
|-
! style=background:white colspan=9 |
|- style="background:#c5d2ea;"
| 2006-03-19|| Draw||align=left| Sinbad Sithbank || AJKF "SWORD FIGHT 2006" || Tokyo, Japan || Decision || 5 || 3:00
|-  style="background:#cfc;"
| 2006-01-04|| Win ||align=left| Koji Yoshimoto || AJKF NEW YEAR KICK FESTIVAL 2006 || Tokyo, Japan || KO (Left Hook) || 2 || 2:30
|-
! style=background:white colspan=9 |
|-  style="background:#cfc;"
| 2005-11-12|| Win ||align=left| Takehiro Yamada || AJKF "Fight Must Go On [All Japan Lightweight Championship Tournament Semi finals] || Tokyo, Japan || Decision (Unanimous) || 3 || 3:00
|-  style="background:#cfc;"
| 2005-09-09|| Win ||align=left| Omar Van Ben Roy ||RISING SUN 6  || Netherlands || KO (Punch) || 2 || 
|-
! style=background:white colspan=9 |
|- style="background:#fbb;"
| 2005-05-15|| Loss ||align=left| Masami Yamamoto || AJKF “STRAIGHT” ||  Tokyo, Japan || TKO (Doctor Stoppage) || 2 || 3:00
|- style="background:#cfc;"
| 2005-03-18|| Win ||align=left| Takahito Fugimaki || AJKF All Japan Lightweight Championship "RUSH!" ||  Tokyo, Japan || KO (Left cross) || 2 || 2:39
|- style="background:#fbb;"
| 2005-01-04|| Loss ||align=left| Tsogto Amara || AJKF “SURVIVOR” All Japan Lightweight Championship ||  Tokyo, Japan || Decision (Unanimous) || 5 || 3:00
|-
! style=background:white colspan=9 |For the AJKF All Japan Lightweight Championship.
|-  style="background:#cfc;"
| 2004-11-19|| Win ||align=left| Koji Yoshimoto || AJKF The Championship, All Japan Lightweight Championship Tournament, Semi Final|| Tokyo, Japan || KO (Left Hook) || 2 || 0:31
|- style="background:#fbb;"
| 2004-08-22 || Loss ||align=left| Liam Harrison || A.J.K.F. SUPER FIGHT -LIGHTNING- || Tokyo, Japan || Decision (Majority) || 5 || 3:00
|- style="background:#fbb;"
| 2004-06-18 || Loss ||align=left| Samkor Kiatmontep || AJKF All Japan Lightweight Tournament 2004 FINAL STAGE, Semi Final|| Tokyo, Japan || Decision (Unanimous) || 3 || 3:00
|-  style="background:#cfc;"
| 2004-04-16|| Win || align=left| Satoshi Kobayashi || AJKF, Lightweight Tournament 2004 2nd.STAGE || Tokyo, Japan || Decision (Unanimous) || 3 || 3:00
|-  style="background:#cfc;"
| 2004-03-13|| Win || align=left| Hiroyuki Takaya || AJKF: "Strongest Tournament 2004 All Japan Lightweight 1st Stage"|| Tokyo, Japan || Decision (Unanimous) || 3 || 3:00
|-
! style=background:white colspan=9 |Lightweight Tournament opening round.
|-  style="background:#cfc;"
| 2004-01-04|| Win || align=left| Kenji Takemura || AJKF All Japan Kickboxing Federation "Wilderness" || Tokyo, Japan || Decision (Unanimous) || 3 || 3:00
|- style="background:#cfc;"
| 2003-11-23|| Win ||align=left| Yoshikazu Murayama || AJKF All Japan Lightweight Championship "SCRAMBLE" ||  Tokyo, Japan || KO (Left cross) || 1 || 1:32
|- style="background:#fbb;"
| 2003-08-17 || Loss ||align=left| Masahiro Yamamoto || AJKF: Hurricane Blow || Tokyo, Japan || TKO (cut) || 2 || 2:43
|- style="background:#cfc;"
| 2003-06-20|| Win ||align=left| Rascal Taka || AJKF "DEAD HEAT"  ||  Tokyo, Japan || Decision (Unanimous) || 3 || 3:00
|- style="background:#fbb;"
| 2002-12-18|| Loss||align=left| Genki Yamamoto || AJKF "BACK FROM HELL-II"  ||  Tokyo, Japan || TKO (Doctor Stoppage) || 1||
|- style="background:#fbb;"
| 2002-10-17|| Loss||align=left| Kenji Takemura || AJKF "Brandnew Fight" - All Japan Featherweight Tournament Semi Finals ||  Tokyo, Japan || Decision (Unanimous) || 3 || 3:00
|- style="background:#cfc;"
| 2001-11-30|| Win ||align=left| Shigeru Arata || AJKF All Japan Lightweight Championship "LIGHT ON!" ||  Tokyo, Japan || Decision (Unanimous) || 3 || 3:00
|- style="background:#cfc;"
| 2001-09-07|| Win ||align=left| Akira Iwasa || AJKF All Japan Lightweight Championship "REVOLVER" ||  Tokyo, Japan || Decision (Unanimous) || 3 || 3:00
|- style="background:#cfc;"
| 2001-02-16|| Win ||align=left| Tomoyuki Morishita || AJKF All Japan Lightweight Championship "BE WILD" ||  Tokyo, Japan || Decision (Unanimous) || 3 || 3:00
|- style="background:#cfc;"
| 2000-11-29|| Win ||align=left| Yousuke Nakagome || AJKF All Japan Lightweight Championship "LEGEND-X" [Freshman Fight] || Tokyo, Japan || KO || 2 || 2:39
|- style="background:#cfc;"
| 1999-09-03|| Win ||align=left| Hideki Akamatsu || AJKF All Japan Lightweight Championship "WAVE-VI" || Tokyo, Japan || KO || 1 || 1:40
|-
| colspan=9 | Legend:

References 

1974 births
Living people
Japanese male kickboxers
Japanese male karateka